Alina Prokopeva (born 16 August 1985, v. Arino) is a female Russian long-distance runner. She competed in the marathon event at the 2015 World Championships in Athletics in Beijing, China.

See also
 Russia at the 2015 World Championships in Athletics

References

External links

Living people
1985 births
Place of birth missing (living people)
Russian female long-distance runners
Russian female marathon runners
World Athletics Championships athletes for Russia
Universiade medalists in athletics (track and field)
Universiade silver medalists for Russia
20th-century Russian women
21st-century Russian women